Georgie Moir (born 1997) is a South African water polo player.

She was part of the South Africa women's national water polo team at the 2020 Tokyo Summer Olympics, where they ranked 10th.

Career statistics

References 

South African female water polo players
Olympic water polo players of South Africa
Living people
1997 births
Place of birth missing (living people)
Water polo players at the 2020 Summer Olympics
21st-century South African women
20th-century South African women